WWIL-FM (Life 90.5 FM) is a radio station  broadcasting a contemporary Christian music format. Licensed to Wilmington, North Carolina, United States, the station serves the Wilmington, Jacksonville and North Myrtle Beach areas.  The station is owned by Carolina Christian Radio, Inc, a 501c3 organization. Carolina Christian Radio is funded by the generous donations of individual listeners.

History
Family Radio Network purchased 1490 AM WWIL in 1993 and, while the station struggled at first, the station was soon doing so well that Jim Stephens planned an FM station.

90.5 FM WWIL signed on in 1995 with 20,000 watts and a contemporary Christian music format that included Sandi Patti, Michael W. Smith, Wayne Watson and First Call as well as talk show hosts Chuck Colson, D. James Kennedy, Joni Eareckson Tada and Chuck Swindoll.

References

External links
 
 

WIL-FM
Radio stations established in 1995
1995 establishments in North Carolina